Shasa is a multinational fashion retailer established in 1995. Shasa offers apparel, jewelry, accessories, beauty and footwear in the women's and man's market.

References

External links

Clothing companies of the United States
Clothing companies established in 1995
Retail companies established in 1995
Retail companies of Mexico
Companies based in Vernon, California